Ohaveč is a municipality and village in Jičín District in the Hradec Králové Region of the Czech Republic. It has about 100 inhabitants.

History
The first written mention of Ohaveč is from 1327.

References

Villages in Jičín District